The Landor River is a river in the Gascoyne region of Western Australia.

The headwaters of the Landor rise north of Mount Erong and flow generally north, joined by two minor tributaries; Flinerty Creek and Fleury Creek. The river forms confluence with the Gascoyne River near the Landor Station homestead. The river descends  over its  course.

The first European to find the river was the surveyor, Henry Carey in 1882. It is thought that he named the river after a prominent Perth barrister, E. W. Landor.

See also

List of watercourses in Western Australia

References

Rivers of the Gascoyne region